The men's foil was one of seven fencing events on the Fencing at the 1928 Summer Olympics programme. It was the seventh appearance of the event. The competition was held from 31 July 1928 to 1 August 1928. 54 fencers from 22 nations competed. For the third straight Games, the limit of fencers per nation was reduced (from 12 to 8 in 1920, from 8 to 4 in 1924, and from 4 to 3 in 1928). The event was won by Lucien Gaudin of France, the nation's second consecutive and fourth overall victory in the men's foil. Erwin Casmir earned silver to give Germany its first medal in the event. Giulio Gaudini of Italy took bronze.

Background
This was the seventh appearance of the event, which has been held at every Summer Olympics except 1908 (when there was a foil display only rather than a medal event). Three of the 1924 finalists returned: gold medalist (and 1920 bronze medalist) Roger Ducret and two-time silver medalist Philippe Cattiau of France, along with sixth-place finisher Ivan Joseph Martin Osiier of Denmark. Osiier was competing in the Games for the fifth time of his eventual seven. The favorite was 1927 world champion Oreste Puliti of Italy, whose Olympic ban resulting from his withdrawal in the 1924 sabre competition had been lifted.

Chile, Finland, Romania, and Yugoslavia each made their debut in the men's foil. The United States made its sixth appearance, most of any nation, having missed only the inaugural 1896 competition.

Competition format

The event used a three-round format. In each round, the fencers were divided into pools to play a round-robin within the pool. Bouts were to five touches. Standard foil rules were used, including that touches had to be made with the tip of the foil, the target area was limited to the torso, and priority determined the winner of double touches.
 Quarterfinals: There were 6 pools of 6–8 fencers each. The top 3 fencers in each quarterfinal advanced to the semifinals.
 Semifinals: There were 3 pools of 8 fencers each. The top 4 fencers in each semifinal advanced to the final.
 Final: The final pool had 12 fencers.

Schedule

Results
Source: Official results; De Wael

Round 1

Each pool was a round-robin. Bouts were to five touches. The top three fencers in each pool advanced to the semifinals.

Pool A

Pool B

Pool C

Pool D

Pool E

Pool F

Pool G

Pool H

Semifinals

Each pool was a round-robin. Bouts were to five touches. The top four fencers in each pool advanced to the final.

Semifinal A

Semifinal B

Semifinal C

Final

The final was a round-robin. Bouts were to five touches. The top three finishers all ended with nine wins, and the tie was broken with a barrage.

Barrage

The barrage was a round-robin among the three top finalists.  Each of three had lost twice in the final round-robin, once to another of the three finalists and once to a fencer who did not place as well.  Gaudin, who had lost to Casmir in the final, beat him in the barrage and notched his second head-to-head victory against Gaudini to win gold.

References

Foil men
Men's events at the 1928 Summer Olympics